Sana Commerce is a B2B e-commerce software company headquartered in the Van Nelle Factory, located in Rotterdam, The Netherlands. Sana Commerce was founded in 2008 by Jan Kees de Jager and Karel van der Woude.

History
Before the foundation of Sana Commerce, ISM eCompany was using SANA (Software Application Network Architecture) as a software platform for web applications and content management websites. 

In 2008, this software was developed into an integrated E-Commerce solution and was named Sana Software. Right from the start, Sana Software was available for Microsoft Dynamics NAV and Microsoft Dynamics AX. In 2013, the brand name was changed into Sana Commerce. From 2014 on, Sana Commerce became available for SAP ERP and was named a SAP Partner.

From the 6th of January 2022, ISM APAC (Pvt) Ltd. took a new leap after eight successive years in the Sri Lankan IT industry to rebrand the company as Sana Commerce (Pvt) Ltd, moving to its new era where it unified with its global brand name, the e-commerce giant, Sana Commerce.

Sana Commerce's premier product is Sana Commerce Cloud, a SaaS-based, best-in-breed e-commerce platform. The platform integrates natively with all Microsoft Dynamics and SAP ERPs.

Native ERP integration in e-commerce 
ERP-integrated e-commerce ensures that all of a company's business data and information is only processed in one place in order to eliminate redundancies, inconsistencies and the need to manually maintain more than one set of business data.

Sana Commerce Cloud offers a drag-and-drop CMS, known as the Visual Designer, tailor-made business growth services, as well as ready-to-use out-of-the box features. Their product suite extends to include a built-in payment provider and analytics platform, all of which integrate directly with the client's ERP system.

Mission 

The Sana Commerce mission is to help manufacturers, distributors, and wholesalers to connect, manage and succeed in creating long-lasting relationships with customers by focusing on improving the buyer relationship rather than simply focusing on transactions.

Certificates and awards 
Sana Commerce is a certified partner of SAP and Microsoft Dynamics. The company was included in the Microsoft Inner Circle for 2017/2018. In addition, Sana Commerce was awarded the Microsoft Dynamics ISV Partner of the Year for the Western Europe region. At the end of August 2017, the company was mentioned for the first time in The Forrester Wave ™, a publication of Forrester titled: “B2B Commerce Suites for Midsize Organizations, Q3 2017”.

Sana Commerce was cited as a Strong Performer in The Forrester Wave™: B2B Commerce Suites, Q2 2020.

Sana Commerce Sri Lanka has been recognized as one of the Top 15 Best Workplaces for Millennials 2022, the Top 100 Workplaces in Sri Lanka as well as the Best 15 Workplaces for Women in Sri Lanka for 2022. Previously, ISM APAC was named as Best Workplaces in Sri Lanka for both 2019 and 2020 making this their third year to be recognized for this achievement.

Sana commerce was awarded as GetApp Category leader 2022 for B2B e-commerce and Order Management.

GetApp Category leaders 2022 for B2B eCommerce (4th place) 

GetApp Category leaders 2022 for Order Management (6th place) 

Each score is based on 5 key criteria, worth up to 20 points:

 Ease of use
 Value for money
 Likelihood to recommend
 Customer Support
 Functionality

Sana Commerce was named a Niche Player in the 2022 Gartner® Magic Quadrant™ for Digital Commerce.

External links 
 Official website
 ISM eCompany

References

Companies based in Rotterdam
Software companies established in 2008
Software companies of the Netherlands
Software using the BSD license